Anthornis is a bird genus in the honeyeater family (Meliphagidae). Its members are called bellbirds. According to genetic data, it is a sister genus to Prosthemadera. 
 
It contains the following species:

 New Zealand bellbird, Anthornis melanura
 Chatham bellbird, Anthornis melanocephala (extinct)

They are named bellbirds because their call sounds like a bell. Young male bellbirds copy the calls of neighbouring older males. Sometimes two males can sing in almost perfect unison because one has been copying the other.

References

 
Bird genera
Taxa named by George Robert Gray
Bird genera with one living species